is a city located in Osaka Prefecture, Japan. It has been one of the largest and most important seaports of Japan since the medieval era. Sakai is known for its kofun, keyhole-shaped burial mounds dating from the fifth century. The kofun in Sakai include the largest grave in the world by area, Daisen Kofun. Once known for swords, Sakai is now famous for the quality of its cutlery. , the city had an estimated population of 819,965, making it the fourteenth most populous city in Japan (excluding Tokyo).

Geography
Sakai is located in southern Osaka Prefecture, on the edge of Osaka Bay and directly south of the city of Osaka.

Neighboring municipalities
Osaka Prefecture
Osaka
Matsubara
Habikino
Ōsakasayama
Kawachinagano
Izumi
Takaishi

Climate
Sakai has a Humid subtropical climate (Köppen Cfa) characterized by warm summers and cool winters with light to no snowfall.

Demographics
According to Japanese census data, the population of Sakai increased rapidly in the 1960s and 1970s, and has been relatively stable since.

History

Origins
The area that would later become known as Sakai has been inhabited since approximately 8,000 BC. Sakai is known for its keyhole-shaped burial mounds, or kofun, which date from the 5th century. The largest of these, Daisen Kofun, is believed to be the grave of the Emperor Nintoku and is the largest grave in the world by area. During the Kofun period between 300 and 500 AD, the Mozu Tumulus Cluster was built from over one hundred burial mounds. The name "Sakai" appears in Fujiwara Sadoyori's poetry by 1045. Most of the current city is located within ancient Izumi Province; however, the wards of Mihara, Higashi and a portion of Kita are located within ancient Kawachi Province.

Tradition holds that 10,000 homes burned to the ground in 1399.

Middle Ages
Medieval Sakai was an autonomous city run by merchant oligarchs. During the Muromachi and Sengoku periods from about 1450 to 1600, Sakai developed into one of richest cities in Japan as a port for foreign trade. It was a leading producer of textiles and ironwork. In those days, it was said that the richest cities were Umi no Sakai, Riku no Imai (tr. "along the sea, Sakai; inlands, Imai"; the latter is now a part of Kashihara, Nara). The famous Zen Buddhist priest Ikkyū chose to live in Sakai because of its free atmosphere. The first reliable account of the city is dated to the 1480s and contains publicly issued legal notices, which suggests that the city had a governing council at that point. By the 1530s, the population was around 40,000 residents, almost all of which earned a living through commercial enterprises and some of whom were the wealthiest people in Japan. At this time, Sakai was administered by an oligarchy of powerful merchants. The government had ten divisions machi that were subordinate to the representative council of wealthy townsmen known as the egoshu.

Sen no Rikyū, known as the greatest master of the tea ceremony, was originally a merchant of Sakai.  Because of the close relationship between the tea ceremony and Zen Buddhism and because of the prosperity of its citizens, Sakai was one of the main centers of the tea ceremony in Japan.

In the Sengoku period, Christian missionaries, including Francis Xavier in 1550, visited Sakai and documented its prosperity. Gaspar Vilela described the town as the safest place in the area when he visited in 1561.
He also mentioned that the city was "governed by consuls like Venice in Italy".

After the coming of Europeans, Sakai became a manufacturing base of matchlock firearms and a daimyō, Oda Nobunaga, was one of their important customers. During his ambitious attempt to unify Japan, Nobunaga attempted to take the autonomy privilege from Sakai. Sakai's citizens denied his order and pitched a desperate battle against his army. Most citizens fled and Sakai was burned and seized by Nobunaga.

After the assassination of Nobunaga in 1582, Toyotomi Hideyoshi, seized power and abolished the autonomous system of Sakai, forcing many merchants to move to his stronghold in Osaka.

In 1615, Sakai was razed to the ground in the SummerCampaign of the Siege of Osaka between the Toyotomi clan and Tokugawa Ieyasu.

Sakai was restored as an important trade center during the Edo period but was involved only in inland trade due to the sakoku policy of the Tokugawa shogunate, which isolated Japan from the outside world. It was also known for its sake brewing and its cutlery industries.  After the isolation policy was abandoned during the Bakumatsu period, Sakai was the location of the Sakai Incident, involving a clash between French sailors and Japanese gendarmes resulting in multiple casualties. When the Western powers demanded the opening of Osaka a port for foreign trade, both Sakai and Hyōgo were named as candidates; however, Sakai's proximity and ease of access to Kyoto and the presence of many imperial tombs led to the selection of Hyōgo.

Modern Sakai
Following the Meiji restoration, Sakai was transformed into an industrial center as part of the Hanshin Industrial Region, with industries centering on textiles and brick making. From 1876 to 1881, Sakai was part of Nara Prefecture. The city of Sakai was proclaimed on April 1, 1889 with the creation the modern municipalities system. It was one of the first 31 cities to be created in Japan. The 1934 Muroto typhoon killed over 300 people in Sakai. Another major disaster was in 1945, when the city was heavily bombed on six occasions during World War II with over 1800 civilian deaths.
Following the February 2005 annexation of the town of Mihara (from Minamikawachi District), Sakai became a designated city in April 2006 giving it a greater measure of self-determination in governmental affairs.

Government
Sakai has a mayor-council form of government with a directly elected mayor and a unicameral city council of 52 members. Sakai contributes eight members to the Osaka Prefectural Assembly. In terms of national politics, the city is divided between the Osaka 15th district, Osaka 16th district and Osaka 17th districts of the lower house of the Diet of Japan.

Local administration
Sakai has seven wards (ku):

Cityscape

Economy
Sakai was traditionally dependent on heavy industry and its port. However, after the period of high economic growth after War War II, along with the development and expansion of the Osaka metropolitan area, Sakai also has lso increased become a satellite city (commuter town) for Osaka metropolis, as represented by the development of Senboku New Town. Shimano, a major manufacturer of cycling and fishing products, is based in Sakai.

Kura Sushi, the conveyor belt sushi chain, has its headquarters in Sakai.

Education

Universities
Osaka Prefecture University
Hagoromo International University
Kansai University Sakai Campus
Poole Gakuin University
Taisei Gakuin University
Tezukayama Gakuin University
Osaka Butsuryo University
Osaka Junior College of Social Health and Welfare
Sakai Women's Junior College

Primary and secondary schools
Sakai has 98 public elementary schools and 43 public middle schools operated by the city government. The city also has one private elementary school,  three private combined middle/high schools and one private combined elementary/middle/high school. The city has 23 public high schools operated by the Osaka Prefectural Board of Education, and four private high schools. The city operates two and the prefecture operates four special education schools for the disabled.

The city previously had a North Korean school, .

Transportation

Airways

Airport
Sakai does not have an airport. The nearest major airport is Kansai International Airport.

Railways
 JR West – Hanwa Line
 -  -  -  -  -  - 
 Nankai Electric Railway -  Nankai Main Line
  -  -  -  -  -  
 Nankai Electric Railway -  Kōya Line
 -  -  -  -  - ] -  -  - 
 Semboku Rapid Railway Co., Ltd. - Semboku Rapid Railway
 -  -  - ] -

Subway
 Osaka Metro -  Midōsuji Line
 -  -

Tramway
Hankai Tramway
Hankai Line：（Sumiyoshi）-  -  -  -  -  -  -  -  -  -  -  -  -  -  -

Bus
Nankai Bus Company, Limited
Nankai wing Bus kanaoka Company, Limited
Kintetsu Bus
Osaka City Bus

Highways

Expressways
Hanwa Expressway
Sakai Senboku Road
Minami-Hanna Road
Hanshin Expressway
4 Bayshore Route
6 Yamatogawa Route
15 Sakai Route

Japan National Route

International relations

Sister cities
 Berkeley, California, United States (1967)
 Lianyungang, Jiangsu, China (1983)
 Wellington, New Zealand (1994)

Friendship cities
 Tanegashima, Kagoshima, Japan (1986)
 Higashiyoshino, Nara, Japan (1986)
 Da Nang, Vietnam (2019)

Notable people from Sakai
Sen no Rikyū, founder of Tea ceremony
Kataoka Ainosuke VI, Kabuki actor, actor, television presenter and entertainer.
Yuki Morisaki, chef and entertainer
Reon Kadena, glamour model and actress
Emperor Nintoku, the 16th Emperor of Japan
Gyōki, Japanese Buddhist priest of the Nara period
Ikkyū, Zen Buddhist monk and poet.
Sen no Rikyū, Japanese tea master
Tsuda Sōgyū, Japanese tea master
Imai Sōkyū, Japanese tea master and merchant
Ōuchi Yoshihiro, Muromachi period samurai clan head and military leader
Kenzō Tange, Japanese award-winning architect
Takeno Jōō
Oreskaband, all-female ska band 
Kana-Boon, Japanese rock band 
Nobuaki Kakuda, karateka and kickboxer
Hiroki Suzuki, Japanese actor and singer
Kentaro Kobuchi and Shunsuke Kuroda, the members of the music group Kobukuro
Akiko Yosano,  poet and novelist
Ryumon Yasuda, painter and sculptor
Hideo Nomo worked in Shin-nittetsu Sakai and played on its club team before he was scouted by the Kintetsu Buffaloes
Yudetamago, manga artist duo (attended Hatsushiba High School in Higashi-ku)
Akio Mori, a well known K-1 kickboxer known as Musashi (kickboxer)
Akira Nagata, actor and singer/vocalist, member of J-pop group Run&Gun
CIMA, Japanese professional wrestler
Fuka Koshiba, Japanese actress

Local attractions

Mozu Kofun Cluster
Kurohimeyama Kofun
Yotsu-ike Site
Dotō
Sakai City Museum
Sakai Matsuri
Tsukuno Danjiri Matsuri

See also
Osaka Metropolis plan

References

External links
Sakai City official website 

 
Cities in Osaka Prefecture
Environmental model cities
Planned cities in Japan
Populated coastal places in Japan
Port settlements in Japan
Cities designated by government ordinance of Japan